The  Courage Award for the Arts is a private award presented annually by Yoko Ono Lennon to artists, musicians, collectors, curators, writers who sought the truth in their work and demonstrated leadership, courage, resourcefulness in their work, and risked their careers by pursuing a larger vision of the local or national interest despite pressure to succumb to commercial and political constraints.  

The award was established in 2009 by Yoko Ono Lennon. Courage Award for the Arts laureates receive a prize of US$25,000.

Recipients

 2016: 
Laurie Anderson
Mohammed el Gharani
 2014: 
Laurie Anderson
Valie Export
Marianne Faithfull
Gustav Metzger
 2013: Julian Assange
 2012: 
 Nabeel Abboud-Ashkar
 Sabine Breitwieser and Jenny Schlenzka
 Kate Millett
 Carolee Schneemann
 Martha Wilson
 2011: 
 Simone Forti
 Jean-Jacques Lebel
 Meredith Monk
 Yvonne Rainer
 2010: 
 Guerrilla Girls
 GuerrillaGirlsBroadBand
 Guerrilla Girls On Tour
 Printed Matter
 Émile Zola
 2009: 
 Gilbert and Lila Silverman
 La Monte Young and Marian Zazeela

References

External links 
 

Arts awards in the United States
Human rights awards
Awards established in 2009
Courage awards
Yoko Ono